Following is a list of elected members of the American National Academy of Medicine.

Members

1970 

Paul Bruce Beeson (d.)
Ivan Loveridge Bennett (d.)
Julius H. Comroe Jr. (d.)
Jerome W. Conn (d.)
Rashi Fein (d.)
Robert J. Glaser (d.)
Robert A. Good (d.)
Leon O. Jacobson (d.)
Henry Kunkel (d.)
Lucile Petry Leone (d.)
Irving London (d.)
Colin Munro MacLeod (d.)
Maclyn McCarty (d.)
Walsh McDermott (d.)
Carl V. Moore (d.)
Samuel M. Nabrit (d.)
Irvine Page (d.)
Henry Riecken (d.)
Walter A. Rosenblith (d.)
Eugene A. Stead (d.)
Thomas Huckle Weller (d.)
Dwight Locke Wilbur (d.)
Bryan Williams (d.)
Adam Yarmolinsky (d.)
Alonzo Smythe Yerby (d.)

1971 

William G. Anlyan (d.)
Allan C. Barnes (d.)
Jeremiah A. Barondess
Alexander Gordon Bearn (d.)
Robert W. Berliner (d.)
Bernard Beryl Brodie (d.)
John Harland Bryant (d.)
John J. Burns (d.)
E. Langdon Burwell (d.)
Robert A. Chase
Martin Cherkasky (d.)
Morris F. Collen (d.)
Robert E. Cooke (d.)
Jerome R. Cox, Jr. (d.)
William Henry Danforth (d.)
Kurt W. Deuschle (d.)
James F. Dickson
Vincent Dole (d.)
Avedis Donabedian (d.)
F. William Dowda (d.)
Robert H. Ebert (d.)
Lloyd C. Elam (d.)
Joseph T. English
Martin Feldstein (d.)
A. Alan Fischer (d.)
Loretta Ford
Donald S. Fredrickson (d.)
Paul A. Freund (d.)
Victor R. Fuchs
Merwyn Greenlick
David Hamburg (d.)
Howard Hiatt
John R. Hogness (d.)
Peter Barton Hutt
Alvin Ingram (d.)
Clifford H. Keene (d.)
Donald Kennedy (d.)
Anne K. Kibrick
Herbert E. Klarman (d.)
Louis Lasagna (d.)
Joshua Lederberg (d.)
Philip R. Lee (d.)
Irving J. Lewis (d.)
Roslyn Lindheim (d.)
Ruth Lubic
Salvador Luria (d.)
Robert W. Mann (d.)
Walter J. McNerney (d.)
David Mechanic
George H. Mills (d.)
Alvin Morris (d.)
Milnor B. Morrison (d.)
Frederick Mosteller (d.)
Marshall Warren Nirenberg (d.)
George Pake (d.)
Gerard Piel (d.)
Chester Middlebrook Pierce (d.)
Hermann Rahn (d.)
Charles H. Rammelkamp (d.)
Julius B. Richmond (d.)
David E. Rogers (d.)
Kenneth J. Ryan (d.)
David Sabiston (d.)
Rozella M. Schlotfeldt (d.)
William B. Schwartz  (d.)
Nevin S. Scrimshaw  (d.)
Henry Silver  (d.)
William A. Spencer (d.)
Lewis Thomas (d.)
John B. Turner (d.)
Joseph F. Volker  (d.)
James V. Warren  (d.)
Richard S. Wilbur 
George D. Zuidema

1972 

Kathleen G. Andreoli 
William O. Baker (d.)
Thomas E. Bryant (d.)
Ewald W. Busse (d.)
Daniel Callahan (d.)
Carleton B.Chapman
Luther Christman (d.)
Price M. Cobbs (d.)
Wilbur J. Cohen (d.)
John A. D. Cooper (d.)
Emilio Q. Daddario (d.)
Rheba de Tornyay (d.)
Paul M. Densen (d.)
Clifton O. Dummett (d.)
Effie Ellis (d.)
Alain Enthoven
E. Harvey Estes
Henry W. Foster
Eliot Freidson (d.)
Eli Ginzberg (d.)
Bernard G. Greenberg
Robert J. Haggerty (d.)
Charles R. Halpern
James G. Haughton (d.)
Edward W. Hawthorne (d.)
George J. Hayes (d.)
H. Carl Haywood (d.)
Nathan Hershey (d.)
Robert Heyssel (d.)
John L. Holloman Jr. (d.)
Henry S. Kaplan (d.)
C. Henry Kempe (d.)
John W. Kirklin (d.)
George I. Lythcott (d.)
Paul A. Marks (d.)
W. Walter Menninger
Morton D. Miller (d.)
James V. Neel (d.)
Quigg Newton (d.)
Edmund Pellegrino (d.)
Paul Ramsey (d.)
James B. Reswick (d.)
Dorothy P. Rice (d.)
Richard A. Smith (d.)
Mitchell W. Spellman (d.)
Daniel C. Tosteson (d.)
Harold Wise (d.)

1973 

Philip Abelson (d.)
Robert A. Alberty (d.)
Odin W. Anderson (d.)
Willis W. Armistead (d.)
Myrtle Aydelotte (d.)
Edgar T. Beddingfield (d.)
Harvey Brooks (d.)
Lewis H. Butler 
Seymour S. Cohen (d.)
Robert Coles 
James F. Crow (d.)
Herb Denenberg (d.)
Carl Djerassi (d.)
Albert Dorfman (d.)
Merlin K. DuVal (d.)
Adrian L. Edwards
Leon Eisenberg (d.)
John R. Evans (d.)
Elsie A. Giorgi (d.)
Carl W. Gottschalk (d.)
James L. Grobe (d.)
Michael J. Halberstam (d.)
James W. Haviland (d.)
M. Alfred Haynes (d.)
Seymour S. Kety (d.)
Eleanor C. Lambertsen (d.)
LaSalle D. Leffall Jr.
Charles E. Lewis (d.)
Margaret E. Mahoney (d.)
Marion Mann (d.)
Robert Q. Marston (d.)
Robert K. Merton (d.)
Mildred Mitchell-Bateman (d.)
J. Warren Perry (d.)
Robert G. Petersdorf (d.)
James G. Price (d.)
Helen Ranney (d.)
Frederick Chapman Robbins (d.)
Doris E. Roberts (d.)
William R. Roy (d.)
Lisbeth B. Schorr
Charles Schultze (d.)
Eleanor Bernert Sheldon (d.)
Cecil G. Sheps (d.)
Lloyd H. Smith (d.)
Anne R. Somers (d.)
Nathan J. Stark (d.)
Rosemary A. Stevens
Andrew L. Thomas (d.)
Paul D. Ward (d.)
Malcolm S. Watts (d.)
Kerr L. White (d.)
J. Jerome Wildgen (d.)
James Wyngaarden (d.)
Asa G. Yancey Sr. (d.)

1974 

Kenneth Arrow (d.)
W. Gerald Austen
Robert M. Ball (d.)
Abraham Clifford Barger (d.)
Paul Berg
Eugene Braunwald
William D. Carey (d.)
Thomas C. Chalmers
Jewel Plummer Cobb (d.)
Anna Bailey Coles (d.)
Theodore Cooper (d.)
David K. Detweiler (d.)
James D. Ebert (d.)
Herman Eisen (d.)
Paul M. Ellwood Jr.
Daniel X. Freedman (d.)
John R. Gamble (d.)
Maureen M. Henderson (d.)
Arthur E. Hess (d.)
James G. Hirsch (d.)
Nicholas Hobbs (d.)
Kurt Julius Isselbacher (d.)
Jean E. Johnson
James F. Kelly (d.)
David M. Kipnis (d.)
Albert L. Lehninger (d.)
Cyrus Levinthal (d.)
Abraham Lilienfeld (d.)
Robert C. Long (d.)
Clement Markert (d.)
Gordon McLachlan (d.)
J. Alexander McMahon (d.)
Sherman M. Mellinkoff (d.)
Matthew Meselson
Arno Motulsky (d.)
Selma J. Mushkin (d.)
Russell A. Nelson (d.)
Lloyd J. Old (d.)
George Emil Palade (d.)
Arthur Pardee (d.)
Edward B. Perrin
Daniel W. Pettengill (d.)
Theodore Puck (d.)
Frederick Redlich (d.)
Milton I. Roemer (d.)
Donald Seldin (d.)
Sam Shapiro (d.)
Robert Louis Sinsheimer (d.)
S. Marsh Tenney (d.)
P. Roy Vagelos
L. Emmerson  Ward (d.)
Charles DeWitt Watts (d.)
Carroll Williams (d.)
Marjorie P. Wilson (d.)
Geraldine Pittman Woods (d.)
Paul Zamecnik (d.)

1975 

Faye Glenn Abdellah (d.)
Lewis M. Branscomb
Lester Breslow (d.)
Neal S. Bricker (d.)
Noah R. Calhoun (d.)
Florence S. Cromwell (d.)
Leonard W. Cronkhite (d.)
Martin M. Cummings (d.)
Carl Eisdorfer
Ronald W. Estabrook (d.)
Saul J. Farber (d.)
Renée Fox (d.)
Richard Garwin
Genevieve T. Hill (d.)
Julius R. Krevans (d.)
Sol Levine (d.)
Gardner Lindzey (d.)
Eleanor Maccoby (d.)
Patricia A. McAtee (d.)
Alton Meister (d.)
Lincoln E. Moses (d.)
Vernon Benjamin Mountcastle (d.)
Franklin David Murphy (d.)
Robert F. Murray
Alan R. Nelson
William Richard Scott
Iris R. Shannon 
Tom Shires (d.)
Jeanne Sinkford
David H. Solomon (d.)
Jonathan M. Spivak
Robert S. Strauss
Jack L. Strominger
Louis Wade Sullivan
August G. Swanson (d.)
Hans-Lukas Teuber (d.)
C. Gordon  Watson (d.)

1976

1977 

Robert J. Blendon
Roger J. Bulger
George E. Burket (d.)
Robert A. Burt (d.)
John A. Clausen (d.)
Karen Davis
Jack Elinson (d.)
Alvan Feinstein (d.)
William Campbell Felch (d.)
Eugene A. Hildreth (d.)
John K. Iglehart
Jay Katz (d.)
Samuel L. Kountz (d.)
Boris Magasanik (d.)
Audrey F. Manley
Jack D. Myers (d.)
Nora K. Piore (d.)
Lee Robins (d.)
Richard S. Ross (d.)
Charles A. Sanders
John F. Sherman (d.)
Burton Weisbrod
Jack E. White (d.)
T. Franklin Williams (d.)

1978 

Daniel L. Azarnoff
David L. Bazelon (d.)
Lonnie R. Bristow
John W. Bussman  (d.)
Barton Childs (d.)
Rita K. Chow
Leighton E. Cluff (d.)
Ralph Crawshaw (d.)
Robert Derzon (d.)
John Thomas Dunlop (d.)
Neil J. Elgee
Edwin C. Evans (d.)
Jacob J. Feldman 
William R. Felts (d.)
Charles D. Flagle (d.)
Ruth S. Hanft (d.)
Donald Henderson (d.)
Robert L. Hill (d.)
James P. Hughes (d.)
Carmault B. Jackson, Jr. (d.)
Frederick S. Jaffe (d.)
Sidney Katz (d.)
Gerald Klerman (d.)
Ben Lawton (d.)
Alexander Leaf (d.)
Edithe J. Levit (d.)
Virgil Loeb (d.)
Richard A. Merrill (d.)
Robert H. Moser (d.)
Joseph Newhouse
Gerald T. Perkoff (d.)
Arnold S. Relman (d.)
Gerald D. Rosenthal
Irving Selikoff (d.)
Barbara Starfield (d.)
David Talmage (d.)
Carl E. Taylor (d.)
Robert L. Van Citters
Kenneth S. Warren (d.)
Ruby L. Wilson
Alejandro Zaffaroni (d.)

1979 

Joel J. Alpert (d.)
Stuart Altman
Richard C. Atkinson
Leona Baumgartner (d.)
Robert M. Berne (d.)
Stuart Bondurant (d.)
Orville Gilbert Brim Jr. (d.)
Robert Neil Butler (d.)
W. Maxwell Cowan (d.)
Andrew D. Dixon (d.)
Harriet P. Dustan (d.)
John W. Farquhar (d.)
William Foege
Christopher C. Fordham (d.)
Fred I. Gilbert (d.)
Jere E. Goyan (d.)
Ruth T. Gross (d.)
Laurie M. Gunter (d.)
Samuel Guze (d.)
Beatrix Hamburg (d.)
Jean L. Harris (d.)
Ada K. Jacox
William J. Kinnard Jr.
Robert S. Lawrence
Jack H. Medalie (d.)
Gil Omenn
David Rall (d.)
Uwe Reinhardt (d.)
Matilda White Riley (d.)
Lewis Hastings Sarett (d.)
J. Edwin Seegmiller (d.)
Maxine Singer
Reidar Fauske Sognnaes (d.)
Charles C. Sprague (d.)
Samuel O. Thier
Alvin J. Thompson (d.)
Arthur C. Upton (d.)
James A. Vohs
I. Bernard Weinstein (d.)

1980 

Herbert L. Abrams (d.)
John E. Affeldt (d.)
Julius Axelrod (d.)
John C. Beck (d.)
Sune Bergström (d.)
Jan E. Blanpain
Elkan Blout (d.)
H. Keith H. Brodie (d.)
Carmine D. Clemente
Richard H. Egdahl (d.)
Claire M. Fagin
Howard S. Frazier (d.)
Emil Frei (d.)
John C. Greene (d.)
Clifford Grobstein (d.)
John A. Gronvall (d.)
Harold Hillenbrand (d.)
Michael M. Karl (d.)
Michael Katz
John K. Kittredge (d.)
Gerhard Levy (d.)
Kenneth L. Melmon (d.)
Howard Newman (d.)
Don K. Price (d.)
Curtis Prout (d.)
Mitchell T. Rabkin
Paul Grant Rogers (d.)
Anne A. Scitovsky (d.)
Belding Hibbard Scribner (d.)
Ethel Shanas (d.)
Henry R. Shinefield
Donald C. Shreffler (d.)
Albert J. Solnit (d.)
Judith P. Swazey
Herman A. Tyroler (d.)
Frank E. Young (d.)

1981 

Linda Aiken
Samuel P. Asper (d.)
Jack Barchas
William Bevan (d.)
Mark S. Blumberg
Kenneth Brinkhous (d.)
Alexander M. Capron
David R. Challoner
Thomas W. Clarkson
Linda Hawes Clever
James A. Clifton (d.)
D. Walter Cohen (d.)
Ernest G. Cravalho
Edgar G. Davis (d.)
Floyd W. Denny (d.)
Daniel Federman (d.)
Maurice Sanford Fox
Charles Fried
Harold Ginsberg (d.)
J. Thomas Grayston
Marie-Louise T. Johnson
Stanley B. Jones (d.)
Albert R. Jonsen
Barbara M. Korsch (d.)
Richard M. Krause (d.)
Robert I. Levy (d.)
Leah M. Lowenstein (d.)
Ida M. Martinson
Charles A. McCallum
Thomas C. Merigan
C. Arden Miller (d.)
John S. Millis (d.)
Norton Nelson (d.)
Charles Odegaard (d.)
Richard J. Reitemeier (d.)
Clayton Rich (d.)
William C. Richardson
Barbara G. Rosenkrantz (d.)
Edward Rubenstein (d.)
Robert F. Rushmer (d.)
Jay P. Sanford (d.)
Thomas Schelling (d.)
Aaron Shirley (d.)
Robert B. Talley (d.)
Alvin R. Tarlov 
Joseph V. Terenzio (d.)
Irwin M. Weinstein (d.)

1982 

Mary Ellen Avery (d.)
Albert L. Babb (d.)
Baruj Benacerraf (d.)
Floyd E. Bloom
Baruch Samuel Blumberg (d.)
Edward Brandt Jr. (d.)
Robert H. Brook
Eric J. Cassell
John D. Chase (d.)
Shirley Chater
Lowell T. Coggeshall (d.)
H. Douglas Collins (d.)
Pedro Cuatrecasas
Worth B. Daniels (d.)
Michael DeBakey (d.)
Roman W. DeSanctis
Donnell D. Etzwiler (d.)
Alfred P. Fishman (d.)
Margaret J. Giannini
Joseph Goldstein (d.)
David S. Greer (d.)
E. Cuyler Hammond (d.)
Barbara C. Hansen
George T. Harrell (d.)
Clark C. Havighurst
Ruby Puryear Hearn
Joseph L. Henry (d.)
S. Richardson Hill Jr. (d.)
William N. Hubbard (d.)
Richard Janeway
Wolfgang Joklik
Mary Ellen Jones (d.)
Samuel L. Katz
Charles R. Kleeman
Norman Kretchmer (d.)
Thomas W. Langfitt (d.)
Joyce C. Lashof
Barbara Joyce McNeil
Thomas W. Moloney
John H. Moxley
Bernard W. Nelson 
Bernice Neugarten (d.)
Daniel A. Okun (d.)
Thomas K. Oliver Jr. (d.)
Seymour Perry (d.)
Frank A. Riddick (d.)
Judith Rodin
John Romano (d.)
Saul A. Rosenberg
James H. Sammons (d.)
Doris R. Schwartz (d.)
George A. Silver (d.)
Frank A. Sloan
Reuel A. Stallones (d.)
Paul D. Stolley (d.)
Raymond P. White 
Maurice Wood (d.)

1983 

Lawrence K. Altman
Ralph L. Andreano
H. David Banta
Ben D. Barker
Karl D.  Bays (d.)
Richard E. Behrman
Henrik H. Bendixen (d.)
Lionel M. Bernstein
Robert L. Black
R. Don Blim
Kenneth E. Boulding (d.)
James A. Campbell (d.)
David S. Citron (d.)
John J. Conger (d.)
William C. Dement
Donna Diers (d.)
Isidore S. Edelman (d.)
George L. Engel (d.)
Carroll L. Estes
Richard G. Farmer
Harvey V. Fineberg
William D.Fullerton (d.)
Alfred Gellhorn (d.)
Paul Goldhaber (d.)
Avram Goldstein (d.)
Morris Green (d.)
Joseph Hamburg (d.)
Margaret C. Heagarty
Robert W.  Jamplis (d.)
Ruth L. Kirschstein (d.)
Arthur Kleinman
Carl Kupfer (d.)
Lester B. Lave (d.)
Philip Leder
Thomas E. Malone (d.)
Donald N. Medearis (d.)
Neal E. Miller (d.)
Duncan vB. Neuhauser
Dominick P. Purpura (d.)
Leon E. Rosenberg
David D. Rutstein (d.)
Jonas Salk (d.)
Steven A. Schroeder
William Silen
Eliot Stellar (d.)
George H. Taber (d.)
Robert E. Tranquada 
Ralph O. Wallerstein (d.)
Lewis W. Wannamaker (d.)
Virginia V. Weldon 
M. Donald Whorton (d.)
Linda S. Wilson
Michael Zubkoff

1984 

Ronald M. Andersen
Howard L. Bailit (d.)
James W. Bawden (d.)
Steven C. Beering
Allan Beigel (d.)
George Benedek
J. Robert Buchanan
William B. Carey
Purnell W. Choppin
Peter B. Dews (d.)
Rhetaugh Graves Dumas (d.)
Mitzi L. Duxbury
David M. Eddy
Charles C. Edwards (d.)
Edward Evarts (d.)
Charles J. Fahey 
Howard E. Freeman (d.)
Tibor J. Greenwalt  (d.)
Jerome H. Grossman (d.)
Melvin M. Grumbach (d.)
Curtis G. Hames (d.)
Robert Hofstadter (d.)
Edward W. Hook (d.)
Lyle Jones (d.)
Robert Katzman (d.)
Stuart Kornfeld
Paul Eston Lacy (d.)
Claude Lenfant
Lawrence S. Lewin (d.)
Ceylon S. Lewis (d.)
Hugh McDevitt
James A. Pittman Jr. (d.)
Moshe Prywes (d.)
Malcom  Randall (d.)
Charles E. Rosenberg
Louise B. Russell
Bruce J. Sams
Robert Schimke (d.)
John R. Seal (d.)
Margretta Styles (d.)
Sheldon M. Wolff (d.)

1985 

S. James Adelstein
D. Bernard Amos (d.)
David Axelrod (d.)
Kathryn Barnard (d.)
Stanley Baum
Roscoe Brady (d.)
Gert H. Brieger
Vincent T. DeVita
John W. Eckstein (d.)
Stefan S. Fajans (d.)
Frank Falkner (d.)
Bernard Fisher
Willard Gaylin (d.)
John P. Geyman
Frederick K. Goodwin
Jerome  Gross (d.)
Thomas F. Hornbein
Robert B. Jaffe
William N. Kelley
Richard J. Kitz  (d.)
Donald A.B. Lindberg
Harald Loe (d.)
Harold S. Luft
James O. Mason
W. Eugene Mayberry (d.)
Beverlee A. Myers (d.)
Elena O. Nightingale
Fred Plum (d.)
George G. Reader (d.)
Janet Rowley (d.)
Frank Ruddle (d.)
Walter O. Spitzer (d.)
Joseph W. St. Geme (d.)
Bruce C. Vladeck

1986 

Henry J. Aaron
Frederick C. Battaglia
J. Claude Bennett
Richard A. Berman
Norman Breslow (d.)
Ralph L. Brinster
William E. Bunney
Thomas B. Clarkson (d.)
Robert B. Copeland 
Ramzi Cotran (d.)
Milo Gibaldi (d.)
Leon Gordis (d.)
Paul Griner
Walter Guralnick (d.)
Richard J. Johns 
Edward H. Kass (d.)
Edward Kravitz
Saul Krugman (d.)
Elaine L. Larson
Alicia Munnell
June E. Osborn
Michael E. Phelps
John T. Potts Jr.
Paul G. Quie
Charles C. Richardson
Robert G. Shulman
Robert D. Sparks (d.)
Edward J. Stemmler
William H. Sweet (d.)
S. Leonard Syme
Henry N. Wagner (d.)
Charles F. Westoff 
Samuel S.C. Yen (d.)

1987 

Henry L. Barnett (d.)
Marshall H. Becker (d.)
Leslie Z. Benet
Michael Stuart Brown
Doris Calloway (d.)
John W. Colloton
Minor J. Coon (d.)
Joseph M. Davie
Howard A. Eder (d.)
Anthony S. Fauci
Suzanne W. Fletcher
Joseph L. Goldstein
Richard W. Hanson (d.)
Birt Harvey
Bernadine Healy (d.)
Samuel Hellman
King K. Holmes
Donald Hopkins
Richard T. Johnson (d.)
Jerome Kagan
Morton Kramer (d.)
Philip J. Landrigan
Gerald D. Laubach
Paul C. MacDonald (d.)
Adel Mahmoud (d.)
Alexander Margulis
Manuel Martinez Maldonado
Howard E. Morgan (d.)
Adrian M. Ostfeld (d.)
Mark V. Pauly
Charles E. Putman (d.)
Alan S. Rabson (d.)
Steven Rosenberg
Roger A. Rosenblatt (d.)
Russell Ross (d.)
Arthur H. Rubenstein
Abraham M. Rudolph
David Sartorelli (d.)
David Satcher
Edward H. Shortliffe
Margaret D. Sovie (d.)
Michel Ter-Pogossian (d.)
Samuel A. Wells
Ioannis V. Yannas
Edward Zigler (d.)

1988 

Francois M. Abboud
Brian Abel-Smith (d.)
David Baltimore
Paul B. Batalden
Edwin L. Bierman (d.)
Barry Bloom
L. Thompson Bowles
Leo K. Bustad (d.)
M. Paul Capp
Charles C.J. Carpenter
Mario M. Chaves
Donald J. Cohen (d.)
Stanley Norman Cohen
Linda C. Cork
Barbara J. Culliton
John R. David
Richard Doll (d.)
Paul Ebert (d.)
John M. Eisenberg (d.)
Bernard N. Fields (d.)
Delbert A. Fisher
Paul S. Frame
Robert J. Genco (d.)
Enoch Gordis
Emil C. Gotschlich
David G. Hoel
Philip Holzman (d.)
Barbara S. Hulka
Lewis Judd (d.)
Eric Kandel
Charles Kiesler (d.)
Sheldon S. King
Luella Klein
Casimir A. Kulikowski
Norma M. Lang
Joseph Larner (d.)
Aaron B. Lerner (d.)
Bernard Lown
Adetokunbo Lucas
Philip Majerus (d.)
Amelia Mangay-Maglacas
Joseph B. Martin
Ian McWhinney (d.)
Sten Orrenius
Frank Oski (d.)
Michael I. Posner
Jonathan E. Rhoads (d.)
Michael Rutter
Rudi Schmid (d.)
Benno C. Schmidt Sr. (d.)
Robert William Schrier
Kenneth I. Shine
Stephen M. Shortell
David B. Skinner (d.)
Solomon H. Snyder
Albert J. Stunkard (d.)
Homer R. Warner (d.)
Noel S. Weiss

1989 

Albert Bandura
G. Octo Barnett
Solomon R. Benatar
Eula Bingham
Els Borst (d.)
Gerard N. Burrow (d.)
C. Thomas Caskey
Evan Charney
C. Robert Cloninger
Harvey R. Colten (d.)
Jack M. Colwill
Rosemary Donley
Laurence E. Earley (d.)
Robert M. Epstein
Myron E. Essex
Harold J. Fallon (d.)
Daniel W. Foster (d.)
Robert Gallo
Alfred G. Gilman (d.)
Harlyn O. Halvorson (d.)
Richard J. Havel (d.)
Betty Hay (d.)
Ada Sue Hinshaw
Stephen C. Joseph
Robert J. Joynt (d.)
C. Everett Koop (d.)
David Korn
David E. Kuhl (d.)
Robert S. Langer
Gwilym S Lodwick (d.)
Ruth Macklin
Halfdan T. Mahler (d.)
Vincent T. Marchesi
Edward A. Mortimer (d.)
David G. Nathan
David E. Poswillo (d.)
John W. Rowe
Harold Tafler Shapiro
Eric Manvers Shooter (d.)
Thomas A. Stamey (d.)
John D. Stobo
Neal A. Vanselow (d.)
Christopher T. Walsh
Gail L. Warden
Milton Weinstein
Jack Wennberg
Gail Wilensky
Warren Winkelstein (d.)
Theodore Woodward (d.)
George Zografi

1990 

Albert Aguayo
Jorge Allende
Thomas P. Almy (d.)
Dorothy Bainton
Samuel H. Barondes 
James Blumstein
Byron W. Brown Jr. (d.)
Thomas F. Budinger 
William T. Butler (d.)
Paul Calabresi (d.)
Joseph A. Califano Jr.
Michael I. Cohen
Max Dale Cooper
Joseph T. Coyle
Haile Debas
Jane F. Desforges (d.)
Joseph W. Eschbach (d.)
Gerald Fischbach
Juanita W. Fleming
Judah Folkman (d.)
Charles K. Francis
Uta Francke
Irving H. Goldberg
DeWitt S. Goodman (d.)
Robert Graham
Jack Wennberg
Gerald N Grob  (d.)
Michael Grossman
Thomas S. Inui
Stephen Jacobsen (d.)
Egon Jonsson
Morris J. Karnovsky (d.)
David Kupfer
Robert Langridge
Judith R. Lave
Walter F. Leavell
David M. Livingston
Robert Marshak
Roger O. McClellan
Ruth McCorkle
John D. Michenfelder (d.)
Mortimer Mishkin
Wataru Mori (d.)
Herbert L. Needleman
Robert E. Patricelli
William E. Paul (d.)
Keith Peters
Roy M. Pitkin
Ross Prentice
Evert Reerink
Alexander Rich (d.)
William L. Roper
Murray B. Sachs (d.)
Simone Sandier
Charles R. Schuster (d.)
James E. Strain
Howard Martin Temin (d.)
Bailus Walker
Peter A. Ward
Joseph B. Warshaw (d.)

1991 

Bernard W. Agranoff
Myron Allukian
Harold Amos (d.)
K. Frank Austen
John R. Ball
C. Wayne Bardin
Elizabeth Barrett-Connor
John A. Benson
J. Michael Bishop
Richard Bonnie
Dorothy Brooten
Larry R. Churchill
Francis Collins
Edward J. Connors (d.)
Patricia M. Danzon
Ezra C. Davidson (d.)
Carolyne K. Davis (d.)
Don E. Detmer
Patricia K. Donahoe
John A. Downey
Gertrude B. Elion (d.)
Philip J. Fialkow (d.)
Yuan-Cheng Fung
Bernard D. Goldstein
G. Anthony Gorry (d.)
Antonio Gotto
Larry A. Green
William R. Hazzard
Edgar B. Jackson
Jerome P. Kassirer
John A. Kirkpatrick (d.)
Barbara J. Lowery (d.)
Myron S. Magen (d.)
Jonathan M. Mann (d.)
Guy M. McKhann
Louis H. Miller
Elizabeth F. Neufeld
Peter Nowell (d.)
Charles P. O'Brien
Suzanne Oparil
Charles E. Phelps
Jens J Pindborg (d.)
Samuel H. Preston
Fred S. Rosen (d.)
Allan Rosenfield (d.)
Gerold L. Schiebler
Lucy Shapiro
Phillip Allen Sharp
Guillermo Soberon
Mildred T. Stahlman
Thoralf M. Sundt (d.)
Jan van Bemmel
Harold E. Varmus
David Weatherall (d.)
Savio L-Y Woo

1992 

Nancy C. Andreasen
Robert Austrian (d.)
Clyde F. Barker
Marilyn Bergner (d.)
Kenneth I. Berns
Jo Ivey Boufford
Ronald N. Bracewell (d.)
William R. Brody
Charles C. Capen (d.)
Robert M. Carey
Christine K. Cassel
Britton Chance (d.)
Allan MacLeod Cormack (d.)
Caswell A. Evans
Daniel M. Fox
Joseph F. Fraumeni Jr.
Kristine Gebbie
Mitchell S. Golbus
M. R. C. Greenwood
Brian E. Henderson (d.)
Kurt Hirschhorn
William Hsiao
John P. Kampine (d.)
Stephen I. Katz (d.)
Haig H. Kazazian, Jr.
Patricia A. King
Seymour J. Klebanoff (d.)
Claude B. Klee (d.)
Franklin M. Loew (d.)
George D. Lundberg
George M. Martin
Paul R. McHugh
Paul Meier (d.)
Ralph L. Nachman
Robert M. Nerem
James G. Nuckolls
Dennis S. O'Leary
Stuart Orkin
Herbert Pardes
Jerome B. Posner
Darwin Prockop
Stanley B. Prusiner
Marcus Raichle
David Rimoin (d.)
Phillips Robbins
Sheila A. Ryan
Ruth Sager (d.)
Jane G. Schaller
Joseph E. Scherger
Lawrence Shepp (d.)
Clement B. Sledge 
Ralph Snyderman
Alfred Sommer
Morton N. Swartz (d.)
Walter J. Wadlington
Thomas A. Waldmann
Laurence R. Young
Nicholas T. Zervas

1993 

Drew E. Altman
Marcia Angell
Arthur K. Asbury
John Christian Bailar (d.)
Robert L. Barchi
David Botstein
Marjorie A. Bowman
Samuel Broder
Benjamin S. Bunney
James P. Comer
EJ Corey
James W. Curran
Thomas F. Deuel
Jack E. Dixon
Sue K. Donaldson
Baruch Fischhoff
Kathleen M. Foley
Julio Frenk
H. Jack Geiger
Irma Gigli
Florence Pat Haseltine
Jules  Hirsch (d.)
Rochelle Hirschhorn
Michael ME Johns
David A. Kessler
Henk Lamberts (d.)
David M. Lawrence
Norman G. Levinsky (d.)
Stephen J. Lippard
Albert Macovski
Theodore R. Marmor
Luigi Mastroianni (d.)
Kathleen A. McCormick
Victor A. McKusick (d.)
Francis Daniels Moore (d.)
Fitzhugh Mullan
Philip Needleman
Dorothy Nelkin (d.)
Bert W. O'Malley
Cecil B. Pickett
William S. Pierce
Mary Lake Polan
Judith L. Rapoport
John B. Robbins
Peter Rosen
Stuart F. Schlossman
Susan C. Scrimshaw
Sheldon Segal (d.)
Larry J. Shapiro
Harold C. Sox
William N. Spellacy (d.)
Glenn D. Steele
Donald M. Steinwachs
Reed V. Tuckson
Paul C. Weiler
Meir Wilchek
Donald E. Wilson
Nancy F. Woods
Vernon R. Young (d.)

1994 

Nancy Adler
Dyanne D. Affonso
Huda Akil
Bobby R. Alford (d.)
Stephen J. Benkovic
Paul C. Brucker (d.)
Patricia Happ Buffler (d.)
Ann Burgess
Anthony Cerami
Iain Chalmers
Yu-Mei Y. Chao
Shu Chien
Paul D. Cleary
Jordan J. Cohen
Molly J. Coye
Gordon H. DeFriese
Mickey S. Eisenberg
Amitai Etzioni
Ruth Faden
Thomas B. Fitzpatrick (d.)
Elaine Fuchs
Patricia Goldman-Rakic (d.)
Ann Graybiel
William J. Hadlow (d.)
Margaret Hamburg 
Peter M. Howley
Dean Jamison
Michael Kaback
Janet C. King
Mary-Claire King
Peter O. Kohler
Robert Lefkowitz
David E. Longnecker
Clement J. McDonald
James J. Mongan (d.)
Joseph Murray (d.)
Hans Neurath (d.)
Jane S. Norbeck
Paul A. Nutting
John A. Oates
Kenneth Olden
Michael Peckham
Theodore L. Phillips
Malcolm C. Pike
Irwin H. Rosenberg
Allen D. Roses (d.)
F. Sherwood Rowland
Richard L. Simmons
Joe L. Simpson
Jerome F. Strauss
Takashi Sugimura
Richard W. Tsien
Ming T. Tsuang
Stanley Watson
Alice S. Whittemore
Jean D. Wilson
Gerald N. Wogan
Flossie Wong-Staal
Tachi Yamada
Anne B. Young

1995 

Cairns Aitken (d.)
Ruzena Bajcsy
William G. Baxt
Arthur Beaudet
Helen Blau
Dan Blazer
Murray Brennan
Howard Brody
Lynn P. Carmichael (d.)
Gail H. Cassell
Dudley S. Childress (d.)
David A. Clayton
Antonio Damasio
Jacqueline E. Darroch
Janice Douglas
R. Gordon Douglas Jr.
Felton Earls
Charles J. Epstein (d.)
Ralph Feigin (d.)
Jonathan Fielding 
Spencer Foreman (d.)
Irwin Freedberg (d.)
Sid Gilman
Robert M. Glickman
Lee Goldman
Lazar J. Greenfield Sr.
John S. Greenspan
Scott M. Grundy
Bernard Guyer
Arthur L. Herbst
Maurice Hilleman (d.)
Jimmie C. Holland (d.)
Sandral Hullett
Richard Hynes
Richard B. Johnston Jr.
Ferenc A. Jolesz (d.)
William B. Kerr
Ernst Knobil (d.)
Arnold J. Levine
Myron M. Levine
James S. Lieberman (d.)
Iris F. Litt
Willard G. Manning (d.)
Angela Barron McBride
Jane Menken
Mary O. Mundinger
Donald L. Patrick
Vivian Pinn
Mamphela Ramphele
Mark C. Rogers
Mark L. Rosenberg
Linda Rosenstock
James Rothman
Stephen J. Ryan (d.)
Harold C. Slavkin
Carolyn Slayman (d.)
Daniel Steinberg (d.)
Judith S. Stern
Shirley M. Tilghman
Roger Y. Tsien (d.)
Emil R. Unanue
Edward E. Wallach
Patrick C. Walsh
Dorothea Zucker-Franklin (d.)

1996 

Clay Armstrong
John P. Atkinson
Marion J. Ball
Alfred O. Berg
Merton Bernfield (d.)
Robert L. Brent
Claire V. Broome
Arvid Carlsson (d.)
Mark R. Chassin
Paul D. Clayton
K. Danner Clouser (d.)
Barbara de Lateur
Allen J. Dietrich
Gerald Fink
Frank Furstenberg
Mitchell H. Gail
John I. Gallin
John W. Gardner (d.)
Marilyn Gaston
James R. Gavin
Robert L. Goldenberg
Lewis R. Goldfrank
Sheldon Greenfield
Rodrigo V. Guerrero
Edgar Haber (d.)
Charlene A. Harrington
Brigid Hogan
Jocelyne Kane-Berman
Robert P. Kelch
David A. Kindig
Richard Klausner
Herbert Kleber (d.)
William J. Koopman
Kiyoshi Kurokawa
Bernard Lo
Joanne Lynn
Henri R. Manasse
Bettie Sue Siler Masters
Mario J. Molina
H. Richard Nesson (d.)
Michael B. A. Oldstone
John Olney (d.)
Scott S. Parker
Shmuel Penchas
Dale Purves
Nancy K. Reame
David Sachs
Marla E. Salmon
Peter T. Scardino
Edward Scolnick
George F. Sheldon (d.)
Thomas Shenk
Samuel C. Silverstein
Mervyn Susser (d.)
Steven R. Tannenbaum
Susan S. Taylor
Gerald E. Thomson
Judith Vaitukaitis
Andrew G. Wallace
John E. Ware Jr.
Kenneth E. Warner
Stephen Waxman
Myron L. Weisfeldt
Myrna Weissman
Torsten Wiesel

1997 

Ron J. Anderson (d.)
George J. Annas
Barbara F. Atkinson
Eugene A. Bauer
Aaron T. Beck (d.)
Regina Benjamin
Donald Berwick
Dennis M. Bier
Mina Bissell
Enriqueta C. Bond
William H. Bowen (d.)
Allan M. Brandt
Jan Breslow
Bruce G. Buchanan
Harry P. Cain
Cho Zang-hee
Mary Sue Coleman
Colleen Conway-Welch
Mark R. Cullen
Peter Dervan
Thomas S. Edgington
C. McCollister Evarts
Stanley Falkow (d.)
Manning Feinleib
Howard L. Fields
Richard G. Frank
Harold P. Freeman
Robert J. Gorlin (d.)
Kevin Grumbach
Zach W. Hall
Barton Haynes
David Ho
Ralph I. Horwitz
David E. Housman
Suzanne T. Ildstad
Tadamitsu Kishimoto
Richard M. Knapp
Risa Lavizzo-Mourey
Howard Leventhal
Charles Marsden (d.)
Marie McCormick
William W. McGuire
John Mendelsohn (d.)
I. George Miller
Linda B. Miller
John Monahan
Peter J. Morris
Jennifer R. Niebyl
Stephen G. Pauker
Steven M. Paul
Philip A. Pizzo
Jeffrey L. Platt
Vinod K. Sahney
Jonathan Samet
Bengt I. Samuelsson
Leonard D. Schaeffer
Gloria R. Smith (d.)
Helen L. Smits
Louis Sokoloff (d.)
Judith Swain
Judith E. Tintinalli
Joseph Volpe
A. Eugene Washington
Ralph Weichselbaum
Bryce Weir
Kenneth B. Wells
Michael J. Welsh
Nancy Wexler
James T. Willerson
Robert Wurtz

1998 

Lu Ann Aday
N. Scott Adzick
Dennis A. Ausiello
Graeme I. Bell
Edward J. Benz Jr.
David Blumenthal
J. Lyle Bootman
Henry Brem
William T. Carpenter
David C. Carter
Willard Cates Jr. (d.)
James Childress
Larry Culpepper
Thomas Detre (d.)
William H. Dietz
Michael V. Drake
Johanna T. Dwyer
Victor Dzau
Steven Gabbe
Alan Garber
Cutberto Garza
Helene D. Gayle
Barbara A. Gilchrest
Laurie Glimcher
Morton F. Goldberg
Robert C. Griggs
George C. Hill
Martha N. Hill
Ronald C. Kessler
Eric Lander
Rudolph Leibel
Alan I. Leshner
Stephen Ludwig
Bruce McEwen
James A. Merchant
Ronald D. Miller
Van C. Mow
Van C. Murad
Woodrow A. Myers
Elizabeth Nabel
Gary Nabel
Carl F. Nathan
Eva Neer (d.)
Eric J. Nestler
Maria New
John W. Owen
Joseph S. Pagano
William A. Peck
Anne C. Petersen
Donald L. Price
E. Albert Reece
Peter G. Schultz
Seymour I. Schwartz
B. A. Schwetz
Goran C. Sedvall
Sally Shaywitz
Zena Stein
Thomas P. Stossel
Kunihiko Suzuki
Carol Tamminga
Palmer W. Taylor
John Vane (d.)
Diane W. Wara
Walter Willett
Ernst-Ludwig Winnacker
Catherine Woteki

1999 

Eli Y. Adashi
Roy M. Anderson
Ba Denian
John G. Bartlett
Douwe Breimer
William R. Brinkley
Kathleen C. Buckwalter
Kevin Campbell
Cyril Chantler
Barry S. Coller
Norman Daniels
Sarah S. Donaldson
Kenneth H. Fischbeck
Paul M. Fischer
Ellen Frank
Michael A. Gimbrone Jr.
David Ginsburg
Patricia A. Grady
Robert A. Greenes
Paul Greengard (d.)
Ed Harlow
Stephen L. Hauser
Richard J. Hodes
Julian T. Hoff (d.)
Edward W. Holmes
Nancy Hopkins
James S. House
Betsy Humphreys
Loretta Sweet Jemmott
C. Ronald Kahn
Arthur Kellermann
Kenneth Kendler
David W. Kennedy
Sung Wan Kim
Kenneth Kizer
Jeffrey P. Koplan
Robert Ledley (d.)
Ting-Kai Li
Nicole Lurie
Michael Marletta
Martha McClintock
W. Ian McDonald (d.)
J. Michael McGinnis
F. A. Murphy
Margaret E. O'Kane
Thomas D. Pollard
Pasko Rakic
Robert Reischauer
Lewis Rowland (d.)
Alan L. Schwartz
Christine Seidman
Carla J. Shatz
Michael L. Shelanski
Jack P. Shonkoff
Kurt C. Stange
Thomas Starzl (d.)
Ian G. Stiell
Inder Verma
Paul Volberding
Daniel Weinberger
Michael J. Welch (d.)
Kern Wildenthal
Catherine M. Wilfert
Douglas W. Wilmore
Mary Woolley
Richard Zeckhauser

2000 

George Aghajanian
Paul S. Appelbaum
Joan K. Austin
Lisa Berkman
Elizabeth Blackburn 
Gunter Blobel (d.)
Clara D. Bloomfield 
Lawrence D. Brown
Jacquelyn Campbell
Nancy Cantor
William A. Catterall 
Thomas Cech
Jean-Pierre Changeux
Dennis S. Charney
Dennis Choi
Noreen M. Clark (d.)
Thomas J. Coates
Hoosen Coovadia
Catherine D. DeAngelis
Arnold Epstein
Dennis G. Fryback
Valentín Fuster
Bruce J. Gantz
Shimon Glick
Larry Gostin
Deborah Greenspan
Jerome Groopman
Charles B. Hammond
Jerris R. Hedges
Jane E. Henney
Eve Higginbotham
Margaret K. Hostetter
Steven Hyman
Lisa Iezzoni
Sherman James
Thomas J. Kelly
Peter S. Kim
John Kitzhaber
William A. Knaus
Mary Anne Koda-Kimble 
David J. Lipman
Jerold F. Lucey (d.)
Gerald L. Mandell
Donald R. Mattison
Richard Mayeux
Elizabeth R. McAnarney
Thomas G. McGuire
Edward D. Miller
Antonia Novello
Seiji Ogawa
Jerrold M. Olefsky
John A. Parrish
Denis Pereira Gray
Charles S. Peskin
Peter Piot
Deborah E. Powell
Howard K. Rabinowitz
Paul G. Ramsey
David D. Sabatini
Donna Shalala
Frank E. Speizer
Larry Squire
William W. Stead
James C. Thompson (d.)
Wylie Vale (d.)
Nora Volkow
Robert Weinberg
William Julius Wilson
Elias Zerhouni
Huda Zoghbi

2001 

George Alleyne
Nancy L. Ascher
Stephen W. Barthold
Bobbie Berkowitz
Thomas F. Boat
Mark Boguski
Patricia Flatley Brennan
Baruch Brody (d.)
Robert H. Brown 
Joan Brugge
Margaret A. Chesney
Philip J. Cook
David R. Cox (d.)
David Cutler
Kenneth L. Davis
Guy B. de The (d.)
Marian Wright Edelman
Robert A. Fishman (d.)
Linda P. Fried
Henry Friesen
Fred Gage
Norman F. Gant
Robert D. Gibbons 
Bradford H. Gray
Fernando A. Guerra
Raquel E. Gur
Stephen Heinemann (d.)
Ralph F. Hirschmann (d.)
Danny O. Jacobs
Mae Jemison
Renee R. Jenkins
Thomas Jessell (d.)
George A. Kaplan
Dennis  L. Kasper
Janice Kiecolt-Glaser
Elliott D. Kieff
Rudolf E. Klein 
Jeffrey Leiden
M. Cristina Leske 
Allen S. Lichter
Jeffrey Lieberman
Robert W. Mahley
Daniel R. Masys
Edward P. McCabe
Alexa T. McCray
Douglas A. Melton
Beverly S. Mitchell 
John Newsom-Davis (d.)
William Nyhan
Eric N. Olson
Edward E. Penhoet
Eliseo J. Pérez-Stable
Gregory Petsko
Bernard Roizman
Cornelius Rosse
Bennett A. Shaywitz
Jane E. Sisk
Mark D. Smith
Brian L. Strom
Leslie Ungerleider
Joseph P. Vacanti
Bert Vogelstein
Robert B. Wallace
Bob Waterston
Stephen J. Weiss
Blaine C. White
David R. Williams
Charles B. Wilson (d.)
Steven H. Woolf
Warren Zapol

2002 

Abul K. Abbas
Harvey J. Alter
Michele Barry
Ronald Bayer
Robert E. Black
Paula A. Braveman
Gordon L. Brownell (d.)
Gro Harlem Brundtland
Steven R. Cummings
Nils Daulaire
Luis A. Diaz
Salvatore DiMauro
Kathleen A. Dracup
David Eisenberg
William E. Evans
Stanley Fahn
Richard Feachem
E. John Gallagher
Linda C. Giudice
Howard H. Goldman
Caroline B. Hall (d.)
Ira Herskowitz (d.)
Bertil Hille
Hedvig Hricak
James M. Hughes
Louis Ignarro
James S. Jackson
Harry R. Jacobson
Robert L. Kahn
Gerald T. Keusch
Stanley J. Korsmeyer (d.)
Stephen W. Lagakos (d.)
Sheila T. Leatherman 
Richard P. Lifton
Bruce Link
James R. Lupski
Malegapuru William Makgoba
Spero M. Manson
Michael Marmot
Barry Marshall
Reynaldo Martorell
Karen Matthews
Afaf Meleis
Michael H. Merson
Charles Nemeroff
Arthur W. Nienhuis
Deborah Prothrow-Stith
James M. Roberts
Gerald M. Rubin
Erkki Ruoslahti
Michael A. Savageau
Thomas L. Schwenk
Debra A. Schwinn
Allen M. Spiegel 
George R. Stark
Ralph M. Steinman (d.)
Lawrence A. Tabak
Nancy J. Tarbell
Craig B. Thompson
John Q. Trojanowski
David Valle
Sheldon Weinbaum
Irving Weissman
Zena Werb
Jeanine P. Wiener-Kronish 
David A. Williams
R. Sanders Williams
Barbara L. Wolfe
Kathryn Zoon
Harald zur Hausen

2003 

James M. Anderson
Ann Arvin
James P. Bagian
William G. Barsan
Robert H. Bartlett
John D. Baxter (d.)
M. Flint Beal
Henry R. Bourne
Rebecca H. Buckley
Peter Buerhaus
Lincoln C.H. Chen
Francis V. Chisari
Lester Crawford
Michael P. Doyle
Jeffrey M. Drazen
Brian Druker
Andrew G. Engel
John W. Erdman, Jr.
Richard R. Ernst
Ronald M. Evans
Paul Farmer
Judith Feder
Jeffrey Flier
Donald Ganem
Lillian Gelberg
Richard H. Gelberman
Roger I. Glass
Michael M. Gottesman
Mark Groudine
Richard L. Guerrant
John Gurdon
Ashley T. Haase
Gail G. Harrison (d.)
William L. Holzemer
Leroy Hood
H. Robert Horvitz
Thomas R. Insel
Rakesh Jain
Timothy R. Johnson
Cynthia Kenyon
Helena Chmura Kraemer
Shiriki Kumanyika
Nicole Marthe Le Douarin
Timothy J. Ley
Douglas R. Lowy
Mark McClellan
Richard T. Miyamoto
Paul L. Modrich
Harold L. Moses
Robin Murray
Godfrey P. Oakley
Jean W. Pape
Margaret A. Pericak-Vance
Neil R. Powe
Arthur L. Reingold
Jim E. Riviere
Diane Rowland
Jeffrey Sachs
Ismail A. Sallam
Hugh A. Sampson
Leona D. Samson
Alan Schatzberg
Oliver Smithies (d.)
Harrison C. Spencer (d.)
Shelley E. Taylor
Peter K. Vogt
Jeffrey A. Whitsett
M. Roy Wilson
Owen Witte
Keith Yamamoto

2004 

Oded Abramsky
Paula Allen-Meares
Frances Arnold
Francine Benes
Georges C. Benjamin
Ruth L. Berkelman
Ernest Beutler (d.)
Joseph A. Buckwalter IV
Sheila P. Burke
Diana D. Cardenas
Carolyn M. Clancy
Fred E. Cohen
Sheldon Cohen
Shaun R. Coughlin
Philip D. Darney
Mark M. Davis
Ciro de Quadros (d.)
Alan DeCherney
Mahlon DeLong
Ronald A. DePinho
Robert J. Desnick
Timothy J. Eberlein
Ezekiel Emanuel
Andrew Fire
James G. Fox
Robert Freedman
Apostolos Georgopoulos
Julie Gerberding
Peter Gluckman
Diane Griffin
John W. Griffin (d.)
Jonathan H. Gruber
Alan Frank Guttmacher
David L. Heymann
Helen Hobbs
Stephen L. Hoffman
Anthony R. Hunter
Brent C. James
Edward H. Kaplan
Kenneth Kaushansky
Jim Yong Kim
Lonnie J. King
Talmadge E. King
Howard Koh
Cato T. Laurencin
Edward R. Laws
John R. Lumpkin
Peter R. MacLeish
Robert Malenka
Andrew Marks
James S. Marks
Ricardo Martinez
Rowena Green Matthews
John D. McConnell 
William C. Mobley
Michael Mulholland
Robert L. Nussbaum
Michael Osterholm
Nancy Padian
Richard Peto
Thomas C. Quinn
K. Srinath Reddy
Jaime Sepulveda Amor
Charles J. Sherr
Eric Topol
Mary Wakefield
Stephen T. Warren
Arthur Weiss
John B. West
Dyann Wirth

2005 

Peter Agre
Allan Basbaum
David W. Bates
John I. Bell
Emilio Bizzi
Troyen A. Brennan
David A. Brent
George W. Brown
Kelly D. Brownell
Dennis A. Carson
Denis A. Cortese
Pietro De Camilli
Jared Diamond
Mary K. Estes
Alex S. Evers
Donna M. Ferriero
Mark Fishman
Michael F. Fleming
Stephen P. Fortmann
Jeffrey M. Friedman
Vanessa Northington Gamble
Michael Gazzaniga
Stanton Glantz
Jesse L. Goodman
Richard H. Goodman
Warner C. Greene
Margaret Grey
Harold W. Jaffe
J. Larry Jameson
Marjorie K. Jeffcoat
Barbara B. Kahn
Larry R. Kaiser
Robert M. Kaplan
Francine Ratner Kaufman
Gabor D. Kelen
Richard D. Krugman
Steven M. Larson
Virginia M.-Y. Lee
Ann C. Macaulay
Floyd J. Malveaux
Frank McCormick
Elizabeth A. McGlynn
Steven McKnight
James O. McNamara
Emmanuel Mignot
Jeanne Miranda
Pascoal Mocumbi
Marilyn Moon
Jonathan D. Moreno
Jeffrey C. Murray
David Naylor
Mary D. Naylor
Eric K. Noji
Stanley Plotkin
Carol Prives
Fred Rivara
Emanuel Rivers
Alan R. Saltiel
Paul Schimmel
Joseph Schlessinger
Dennis J. Selkoe
Val C. Sheffield
Gerald I. Shulman
Burton H. Singer
Virginia A. Stallings
Joan A. Steitz
Peter Szolovits
Raymond L. White (d.)
Leonard I. Zon

2006 

Nancy C. Andrews
Suzanne Bakken
Lance Becker
Timothy Billiar
John D.  Birkmeyer
Carol M. Black
Robert W. Blum
Michael Boehnke
Dan W. Brock
Linda B. Buck
Alta Charo
Nicholas A. Christakis
Francisco G. Cigarroa
Ellen Wright Clayton
Graham Colditz
Chi Van Dang
Betty Diamond
Elazer R. Edelman
Stephen Elledge
Elliott S. Fisher
Richard A. Flavell
Gary R. Fleisher
Theodore G. Ganiats
Kathleen Giacomini
Sherry Glied
Stephen P. Goff
Marthe R. Gold
Francisco Gonzalez-Scarano
Sten Grillner
David A. Grimes
Maxine Hayes
Susan Band Horwitz
Rudolf Jaenisch
Dilip V. Jeste
Emmett B. Keeler
Raynard S. Kington
H. Clifford Lane
Mitchell Lazar
Susan Lindquist (d.)
George Lister
Joseph Loscalzo
Martha L. Ludwig (d.)
James D. Marks
Robert L. Martuza
Joan Massagué
John C. Mazziotta
Martin McKee
Catherine G. McLaughlin
Randolph A. Miller
Anne Mills
Arnold S. Milstein
Ruth Sonntag Nussenzweig (d.)
Baldomero Olivera
Walter Orenstein
Guy H. Palmer
Leena Peltonen-Palotie (d.)
Kenneth S. Polonsky
Thomas H. Rice
Jane S. Richardson
John Rubenstein
Paul A. Sieving
Richard J. Smith
G. Gayle Stephens (d.)
William M. Tierney 
Ajit Varki
Ellen Vitetta
Judith Wasserheit
Alastair J. Wood
Scott L. Zeger
Charles Zuker

2007 

James P. Allison
Robert J. Alpern
Richard A. Andersen
David A. Asch
Bruce J. Baum
Ronald Brookmeyer
Emery N. Brown
Wylie Burke
Frederick M. "Skip" Burkle Jr.
Kathryn Calame
Michael L. Callaham
Webster Cavenee
Aravinda Chakravarti
Leighton Chan
Zhu Chen
Richard D. Clover (d.)
Joel D. Cooper
Kay Dickersin
Nancy Wilson Dickey
Andrew Paul Feinberg
Lee A. Fleisher
Patricia A. Ganz
Arthur Garson
Gary H. Gibbons
Lynn Goldman
Ellen R. Gritz
Andrew Haines
Victoria Hale
Katherine A. High
Alan H. Jobe
William G. Kaelin
Ann-Louise Kinmonth
Darrell Kirch
K. Ranga R. Krishnan
Harlan Krumholz
Eric B. Larson
Theodore S. Lawrence
Ronald Levy
David A. Lewis
Michael T. Longaker
Susan E. Mackinnon
Cynthia Mulrow
Christopher J. L. Murray
James M. Ostell
Luis F. Parada
Timothy A. Pedley
Herbert B. Peterson
Roderic I. Pettigrew
John Edward Porter
Louis Ptáček
Amelie G. Ramirez
Jeffrey V. Ravetch
Roberto Romero
David A. Savitz
David T. Scadden
Matthew P. Scott
Jonathan Seidman
Jonathan Skinner
Peter St George-Hyslop
Arnold W. Strauss
Thomas C. Südhof
B. Katherine Swartz
Paul C. Tang
Mary Tinetti
Kamil Ugurbil
Antonia M. Villarruel
Edward H. Wagner
Keith Wailoo
Carolyn L. Westhoff

2008 

Lucile L. Adams-Campbell
Kathryn Virginia Anderson
Jeff Balser
Jean Bennett
Bruce Beutler
Maureen Bisognano
Thomas S. Bodenheimer
Aaron Ciechanover
Lisa Cooper
Lawrence Corey
George Davey Smith
Patrick H. DeLeon
Angela Diaz
Harry C. Dietz
Peter Doherty
Kathryn M. Edwards
Jonathan A. Epstein
Jose Julio Escarce
Maria Freire
Walter R. Frontera
Sanjiv Sam Gambhir
Naomi L. Gerber
Jeffrey I. Gordon
David S. Guzick
Douglas Hanahan
James E. Hildreth
David M. Holtzman
Arthur L. Horwich
Peter Hotez
Elaine Jaffe
Phyllis J. Kanki
John Kappler
Nancy Kass
Gary A. Koretzky
Arnold Kriegstein
Raju S. Kucherlapati
W. Marston Linehan
Depei Liu
Husseini K. Manji
Howard Markel
Philippa Marrack
Helen S. Mayberg
Anthony D. Mbewu
Linda McCauley
Juanita Merchant
Michael Merzenich
James W. Mold
Marsha A. Moses
Ralph W. Muller
Milap C. Nahata
John E. Niederhuber
Olufunmilayo Olopade
Joseph P. Ornato
Peter R. Orszag
David C. Page
Nicholas A. Peppas
David H. Perlmutter
Etta D. Pisano
Linda A. Randolph
Barbara K. Rimer
Louise M. Ryan
Charles Sawyers
Anne Schuchat
J. Sanford Schwartz
Terry Sejnowski
Ira Shoulson
Peter A. Singer
William A. Vega
Gary L. Westbrook
Phyllis Wise

2009 

Russ Altman
Kristi Anseth
Karen Ashe
Tom P. Aufderheide
Michelle H. Biros
Jeanne Brooks-Gunn
Patrick O. Brown
Donald Burke
Martin Chalfie
Setsuko K. Chambers
Arul Chinnaiyan
Michael L. Cleary
Tom Curran
Michael R. DeBaun
Susan Dentzer
Ana V. Diez Roux
Wafaa El-Sadr
Amy Finkelstein
Garret A. FitzGerald
Richard Frackowiak
Thomas R. Frieden
Alfred L. Goldberg
Sue J. Goldie
Dana P. Goldman
Deborah G. Grady
Lawrence W. Green
Daniel A. Haber
Michael R. Harrison
Samuel Hawgood
Robert B. Haynes
Carol Pearl Herbert
Eric C. Holland
Mark S. Humayun
Tyler Jacks
Alexandra L. Joyner
Frederick S. Kaplan
Michael B. Kastan
Ichiro Kawachi
Isaac S. Kohane
Uma R. Kotagal
Story C. Landis
Roger J. Lewis
Jennifer Lippincott-Schwartz
Alan D. Lopez
Joanne R. Lupton
Terry F. McElwain
Roberta B. Ness
Roger A. Nicoll
Nancy H. Nielsen
Michel C. Nussenzweig
Daniel K. Podolsky
Joan Y. Reede
Maximilian F. Reiser
Allan L. Reiss
Mary V. Relling
John A. Rich
Griffin P. Rodgers
Gary Ruvkun
William M. Sage
Clifford B. Saper
Amita Sehgal
Joe V. Selby
Lawrence Steinman
Barbara J. Stoll
Megan Sykes
Selwyn M. Vickers
Bruce D. Walker
Douglas C. Wallace
Ralph Weissleder
Susan M. Wolf

2010 

David M. Altshuler
Hortensia de los Angeles Amaro
Kenneth C. Anderson
John Z. Ayanian
Jeremy M. Berg
Nancy Berliner
Linda S. Birnbaum
Sydney Brenner (d.)
Benjamin S. Carson Sr.
Michael E. Chernew
George P. Chrousos
Peter Cresswell
Sue Curry
Charles A. Czeisler
Ralph G. Dacey Jr.
Riccardo Dalla-Favera
Robert B. Darnell
Titia de Lange
Frank V.  deGruy III
Karl Deisseroth
Susan Desmond-Hellmann
Raymond Dingledine
Jennifer A. Doudna
Deborah A. Driscoll
Michael F. Drummond
Richard L. Ehman
Jack A. Elias
Charis Eng
Joseph J. Fins
Elena Fuentes-Afflick
Zvi Y. Fuks
Terry T. Fulmer
Stephen J. Galli
Robert S. Galvin
Bruce D. Gelb
Gary L. Gottlieb
Carol W. Greider
Beatrice H. Hahn
Qide Han
Roger A. Johns
Kevin B. Johnson
Roger D. Kamm
Terry P. Klassen
John H. Krystal
Nathan Kuppermann
Michael D. Lairmore
Caryn Lerman
Charles J. Lockwood
Chad A. Mirkin
Suzanne P. Murphy
J. Marc Overhage
Ira Pastan
Robert L. Phillips Jr.
Peter J. Polverini
Jill Quadagno
Neil J. Risch
Bruce Rosen
David Rosner
Kevan M. Shokat
Diane M. Simeone
David J. Skorton
Joseph W. St. Geme III
John R. Stanley
Margaret G. Stineman
Mary T. Story
Jeremy Sugarman
George E. Thibault
Connie M. Weaver
Thomas E. Wellems
Carl Wu

2011 

Barbara Abrams
Margarita Alegria
Frederick W. Alt
Karen H. Antman
Anthony J. Atala
Katherine Baicker
Carolyn R. Bertozzi
Martin J. Blaser
W. Thomas Boyce
Claire D. Brindis
Bruce N. Calonge
John Chae
Frank A. Chervenak
Vivian G. Cheung
Patricia A. Conrad
Carlo M. Croce
George Q. Daley
Nancy E. Davidson
Mark E. Davis
Joel DeLisa
David L. Eaton
Diana L. Farmer
Claire M. Fraser
Margaret T. Fuller
Joe G. N. Garcia
Atul Gawande
George Georgiou
Daniel H. Geschwind
Richard A. Gibbs
Jonathan D. Gitlin
Glenda E. Gray
Joe W. Gray
Stephen W. Hargarten
Tomas Hökfelt
Richard Horton
Jennifer L. Howse
Richard L. Huganir
Sharon K. Inouye
Richard J. Jackson
Timothy Jost
Yuet Wai Kan
Michael Karin
Michael L. LeFevre
Roderick J. A. Little
Jay Loeffler
JoAnn E. Manson
Carol A. Mason
Jeremy Nathans
Paul A. Offit
Ora H. Pescovitz
Christine Petit
Claire Pomeroy
Peter J. Pronovost
Daniel J. Rader
David A. Relman
David R. Rubinow
 David Serwadda
James P. Smith
Jeannette Elizabeth South-Paul
Mriganka Sur
Marc T. Tessier-Lavigne
James H. Thrall
David A. Tirrell
Li-Huei Tsai
Abraham C. Verghese
Barbara Vickrey
David Vlahov
Mark E. von Zastrow
Cun-Yu Wang
James N. Weinstein

2012 

Salim Abdool Karim
Gustavo D. Aguirre
David B. Allison
Norman B. Anderson
Lawrence Appel
Jacqueline K. Barton
Robert D. Beauchamp
Shelley L. Berger
Bruce R. Blazar
Michael L. Boninger
Nancy M. Bonini
David A. Brenner
John M. Carethers
Amitabh Chandra
Lynda Chin
Don W. Cleveland
Myron S. Cohen
James J. Collins
David A. Compston
PonJola Coney
Eileen M. Crimmins
Nigel Crisp
Jian-Ping Dai
Lisa DeAngelis
John O. DeLancey
Sherin U. Devaskar
Vishva M. Dixit
John P. Donoghue
Robert H. Edwards
Christopher J. Elias
Michael Fiore
Thomas R. Fleming
Sandro Galea
Jennifer Grandis
Robert M. Groves
Paul H. Grundy
George Hripcsak
Donald E. Ingber
David Julius
Carl June
Daniel L. Kastner
Lydia E. Kavraki
Paula Lantz
Albert Lee
Tracy A. Lieu
Dan R. Littman
Jens Ludwig
Terry Magnuson
Tom Maniatis
Diane McIntyre
Antonios G. Mikos
Lloyd B. Minor
Albert G. Mulley
Jack Needleman
Peter Palese
Martin A. Philbert
Marina Picciotto
Jennifer M. Puck
Stephen R. Quake
Marilyn Rantz
Kerry J. Ressler
Wayne J. Riley
Martin Roland
Sara Rosenbaum
Arthur B. Sanders
Andrew I. Schafer
Mitchell D. Schnall
Fritz H. Schroder
Gregg L. Semenza
Nelson K. Sewankambo
Steven A. Siegelbaum
David Spiegel
Andy S. Stergachis
David K. Stevenson
Gerold Stucki
Sten H. Vermund
Kevin G. Volpp
Diana J. Wilkie
Wayne M. Yokoyama
Charles F. Zorumski

2013 

Janis L. Abkowitz
Frederick R. Appelbaum
Katrina Armstrong
Sabaratnam Arulkumaran
Diana W. Bianchi
Jeffrey Bluestone
Charles L. Bosk
Mary Bartlett Bunge
Molly Cooke
Delos M. Cosgrove III
Patrick Couvreur
Janet Currie
Mary D'Alton
Ara Darzi
Carlos del Rio
David L. DeMets
Phyllis A. Dennery
James R. Downing
Jeffrey A. Drebin
Gideon Dreyfuss
Daiming Fan
Eric R. Fearon
Mark E. Frisse
Judy E. Garber
Ronald N. Germain
Arline T. Geronimus
Karen Glanz
Joseph G. Gleeson
Susan B. Hassmiller
Mauricio Hernandez-Avila
Jody Heymann
Waun Ki Hong (d.)
Brian Jack
Clifford R. Jack Jr.
Carlos R. Jaen
Alan M. Jette
Ashish Jha
Gary S. Kaplan
Evan D. Kharasch
Richard D. Kolodner
Sally Kornbluth
Ann Kurth
Nancy E. Lane
Anne Laude
Thomas A. LaVeist
Quynh-Thu Le
Brendan Lee
Warren J. Leonard
Pat R. Levitt
Beverly Malone
Eve Marder
Jonna A. K. Mazet
Ruslan Medzhitov
Diane E. Meier
Michelle M. Mello
Bernadette Mazurek Melnyk
David J. Mooney
Louis J. Muglia
Joan M. O'Brien
Francis Omaswa
Moshe Oren
Daniel S. Pine
Helen Piwnica-Worms
Bruce M. Psaty
Danny Reinberg
J. Evan Sadler
Yoel Sadovsky
Peter Salovey
Mark A. Schuster
Nirav R. Shah
George M. Shaw
Xiaoming Shen
Lisa Simpson
Pamela Sklar (d.)
Matthew W. State
Georg Stingl
Subra Suresh
Christopher A. Walsh
Elizabeth (Betsy) E. Weiner
James Woolliscroft

2014 

Quarraisha Abdool Karim 
Goncalo Abecasis
Rafi Ahmed
Robert Aronowitz
Ben Barres  (d.)
José Baselga
Chris Beyrer
Walter Boron
Carol R. Bradford
Jeffrey Brenner
Nancy J. Brown
Lewis C. Cantley
Arturo Casadevall
Elliot L. Chaikof
E. Antonio Chiocca
James J. Cimino
Patrick H. Conway
Pascale Cossart
James E. Crowe Jr.
Pamela B. Davis
Linda C. Degutis
Joseph M. DeSimone
Jennifer E. DeVoe
Daniel B. Drachman
James S. Economou
Eva Feldman
A. Mark Fendrick
Stephanie L. Ferguson
Todd Golub
Eric Goosby
Mark A. Hall
Margaret Heitkemper
Christian J. Herold 
James O. Hill
Bradley Hyman
George J. Isham
Julie A. Johnson
Paula A. Johnson
Gerald Joyce
Gérard Karsenty
Mitchell H. Katz
Yang Ke
Carol Keehan
Sara Kenkare-Mitra
Paul A. Khavari
Mary E. Klotman
Brian K. Kobilka
Richard G. Kronick
Christian P. Larsen
Steven H. Lipstein
Catherine Lord
Guillermina Lozano
Edward W. Merrill
Kelle H. Moley
Denis Mukwege
Susan A. Murphy
John J. O'Shea Jr.
Harry T. Orr
David Piwnica-Worms
Kathleen Potempa
Meredith Rosenthal
Bryan L. Roth
W. Mark Saltzman
Randy W. Schekman
Michael V. Sefton
Martin-Jose J. Sepulveda
Michael N. Shadlen
Joshua M. Sharfstein
Margaret Shipp
Bruce M. Spiegelman
Deepak Srivastava
Robyn Stone
Joseph S. Takahashi
Dan Theodorescu
Irma Thesleff
Sheila Tlou
Ronald D. Vale
Gordana Vunjak-Novakovic
Charlotte Watts

2015 

E. Dale Abel
Sudhir Anand
Christopher P. Austin
Howard Bauchner
Kirsten Bibbins-Domingo
Andrew B. Bindman
Diane F. Birt
Rena Bizios
Otis Brawley
Serdar Bulun
Linda Burnes Bolton
Atul Butte
Joseph Buxbaum
Mario Capecchi
Jean-Laurent Casanova
Glenn M. Chertow
Kathleen R. Cho
Benjamin K. Chu
Sarah Cleaveland
Josep Dalmau
Sally C. Davies
Tejal A. Desai
Richard DiMarchi
Dennis E. Discher
Kenneth A. Dodge
Ronald Duman
James C. Eisenach
Napoleone Ferrara
Julie Ann Freischlag
Amato J. Giaccia
Melissa L. Gilliam
D. Gary Gilliland
Christopher K. Glass
Fastone M. Goma
Michael R. Green
Murat Gunel
Robert A. Harrington
Sean Hennessy
Friedhelm Hildebrandt
Frank Hu
Anna Huttenlocher
Frances E. Jensen
Ned H. Kalin
Beth Karlan
Arthur Kaufman
Kenneth W. Kinzler
Keith P. Klugman
Walter J. Koroshetz
Vivian Lee
Kung-Yee Liang
Roberto Malinow
Laurie K. McCauley
David A. McCormick
David O. Meltzer
Joan W. Miller
Vincent Mor
James Morone
Edvard I. Moser
May-Britt Moser
Vasant Narasimhan
Robert W. Neumar
Laura E. Niklason
Elizabeth O. Ofili
Nikola Pavletich
Jonathan B. Perlin
Kenneth Ramos
Bonnie Ramsey
Valerie F. Reyna
Alexander Rudensky
Richard H. Scheller
Susan E. Skochelak
Nahum Sonenberg
Douglas Staiger
Kevin Struhl
Chorh Chuan Tan
Marita G. Titler
Richard L. Wahl
Alan R. Weil
John Whyte
Shinya Yamanaka

2016 

Anissa Abi-Dargham
Anita L. Allen
María José Alonso
Masayuki Amagai
Cheryl A. M. Anderson
Peter Bach
Bonnie Bassler
Andrew W. Bazemore
Per-Olof Berggren
Karen F. Berman
Andrea L. Cheville
Anne L. Coleman
Kathleen L. Collins
Roger D. Cone
Martha A.Q. Curley
Joseph DeRisi
Francis J. Doyle III
Karen M. Emmons
Elissa S. Epel
Timothy G. Evans
Carol Friedman
K. Christopher Garcia
Patricia J. Garcia
Carmen Garcia-Pena
Martin Gaynor
Maura L. Gillison
Alison Goate
Sarah J. Halton
Paula T. Hammond
Stanley L. Hazen
Mukesh K. Jain
Maria Jasin
Prabhat Jha
Jeffrey Kahn
Melina Kibbe
Allan Kirk
Mark Krasnow
Francis S. Lee
T. Jake Liang
Maureen Lichtveld
George A. Macones
Kelsey Martin
Donald P. McDonnell
Bruce L. Miller
Samir Mitragotri
Valerie Montgomery Rice
John H. Morrison
Mark A. Musen
K.M. Venkat Narayan
Kenneth Offit
James Marc Perrin
Bernice A. Pescosolido
Thomas A. Rando
Lynne D. Richardson
James A. Roth
Paul B. Rothman
James F. Sallis
Jane E. Salmon
Aziz Sancar
Tadatsugu Taniguchi
Hugh S. Taylor
Oyewale Tomori
Craig Venter
Cheryl Lyn Walker
David R. Walt
Huntington Willard
Michelle Ann Williams
Xiaoliang S. Xie
Clyde Yancy
Michael J. Yaszemski

2017 

Mark E. Anderson
Scott A. Armstrong
Amy Arnsten
Cornelia Bargmann
Mary T. Bassett
Samuel Berkovic
Christopher N. Bowman
Elizabeth H. Bradley
Robert F. Breiman
Melinda B. Buntin
Carrie L. Byington
Neil Calman
Xuetao Cao
Anne Case
Arup Chakraborty
Howard Y. Chang
Wendy W. Chapman
Tina L. Cheng
Marshall H. Chin
Lewis A. Chodosh
Christos Coutifaris
Benjamin Cravatt III
Alan D'Andrea
Mark J. Daly
Richard Davidson
Joshua C. Denny
Karen DeSalvo
Sharon M. Donovan
Mark R. Dybul
Evan E. Eichler
Serpil Erzurum 
Jeremy Farrar
Alain Fischer
Mona N. Fouad
Gerard E. Francisco
Rebekah Gee
Christine Grady
Rachel Green
Michael E. Greenberg
Felicia Hill-Briggs
Chanita Hughes-Halbert
Scott J. Hultgren
Yasmin Hurd
Nicholas P. Jewell
V. Craig Jordan
Eve A. Kerr
George Koob
Gabriel Krestin
Paul P. Lee
Allan I. Levey
Charles M. Lieber
Daniel H. Lowenstein
Lynne E. Maquat
Gerald Markowitz
John R. Mascola
Tirin Moore
Robin P. Newhouse
M. Kariuki Njenga
Gbenga Ogedegbe
Rebecca Onie
Maria A. Oquendo
Michael S. Parmacek
Ramon E. Parsons
Scott Pomeroy
Martin G. Pomper
Rita F. Redberg
Lesley Regan
Therese S. Richmond
Dorothy Roberts
John H. Sampson
Robert F. Siliciano
Leif I. Solberg
Soumya Swaminathan
Viviane Tabar
Masayo Takahashi
Suzanne L. Topalian
Nicholas J. White
Flaura K. Winston
Donald M. Yealy

2018 

Hanan M. Al-Kuwari
R. Bruce Aylward
Françoise Barré-Sinoussi
Linamara R. Battistella
Yasmine Belkaid
James M. Berger
Richard E. Besser
Zulfiqar Bhutta
Richard S. Blumberg
Azad Bonni
Andrea Califano
Michael A. Caligiuri
Clifton W. Callaway 
Elias Campo
Yang Chai
Giselle Corbie-Smith
Peter Daszak
Michael S. Diamond
Susan M. Domchek
Francesca Dominici
Benjamin L. Ebert
Robert L. Ferrer
Jennifer Elisseeff
Robert M. Friedlander
Ying-Hui Fu
William A. Gahl
Joshua A. Gordon 
Scott Gottlieb
David A. Hafler
Evelynn M. Hammonds
David N. Herndon
Steven M. Holland 
Amy J. Houtrow
Jeffrey Hubbell 
John Ioannidis
Robert E. Kingston
Ophir Klein
Alex H. Krist
John Kuriyan
Joy Lawn
Ellen Leibenluft
Gabriel Leung
Linda M. Liau
Keith D. Lillemoe
Xihong Lin
Catherine R. Lucey
Ellen J. MacKenzie
Marty Makary
Bradley A. Malin 
George Mashour
Ann McKee
Barbara J. Meyer
Matthew L. Meyerson
Terrie E. Moffitt
Sean J. Morrison
Charles A. Nelson III
Kunle Odunsi
Lucila Ohno-Machado
Jordan S. Orange
Beverley A. Orser
 Lori J. Pierce
Daniel Polsky
Hector P. Rodriguez
Stuart Schreiber
Arlene Sharpe
Marie Celeste Simon
Albert Siu
Ralph L. Sacco
Claire E. Sterk
Susan E. Stone
Sylvia Trent-Adams
Kara Odom Walker
Peter Walter
Xiaobin Wang
Ronald J. Weigel
Rachel M. Werner
Janey L. Wiggs
Teresa Woodruff
King-Wai Yau

2019 

 Edwin (Ted) G. Abel
 Denise Aberle
 Charles S. Abrams
 Anthony Adamis
 Adaora Adimora
 Julia Adler-Milstein
 Nita Ahuja
 C. David Allis
 David Amaral
 Vineet Arora
 Carol Baker
 Colleen Barry
 Elaine Batchlor
 Peter Bearman
 Sangeeta Bhatia
 L. Ebony Boulware
 Charles Branas
 David Cella
 Deborah Cohen
 Dorin Comaniciu
 Rui Costa
 Rebecca Miriam Cunningham
 Hongjie Dai
 James Tilmon Dalton
 Beverly Davidson
 George Demiris
 Raymond N. DuBois Jr.
 James Eberwine
 Elizabeth Engle
 Deborah Estrin
 Betty Ferrell
 Jorge Galán
 Tejal Kanti Gandhi
 Sharon Gerecht
 Margaret Goodell
 Laura Gottlieb
 Stephan Grupp
 Sanjay Gupta
 J. Silvio Gutkind
 Daphne Haas-Kogan
 Julia Haller
 M. Elizabeth Halloran
 Diane Havlir
 Debra Houry
 Akiko Iwasaki
 Elizabeth Jaffee
 S. Claiborne (Clay) Johnston
 Rainu Kaushal
 K. Craig Kent
 Adrian R. Krainer
 Peter Kihwan Lee
 Richard Legro
 Michael Lenardo
 Ernst Robert Lengyel
 Scott Lowe
 Carol Mangione
 Elaine Mardis
 Peter Margolis
 Ellen Meara
 David Meyers
 Guo-li Ming
 Kathleen Neuzil
 Craig Newgard
 Luigi Notarangelo
 Gabriel Núñez
 Andre Nussenzweig
 Krzysztof Palczewski
 Julie Parsonnet
 Jonathan Alan Patz
 Rafael Perez-Escamilla
 Susan Quaggin
 Scott L. Rauch
 John A. Rogers
 Anil Rustgi
 David Schatz
 Dorry Segev
 Julie Segre
 Nenad Sestan
 Peter Slavin
 Benjamin D. Sommers
 Beth Stevens
 Jacquelyn Taylor
 Mehmet Toner
 Peter Ubel
 Nicholas Wald
 Catherine S. Woolley
 Catherine J. Wu
 Joseph C. Wu
 Kristine Yaffe
 Rachel Yehuda
 Richard A. Young

2020 

 Susan Ackerman
 Rexford S. Ahima
 Mark S. Anderson
 Sonia Y. Angell
 Kyriacos A. Athanasiou
 Andrea Baccarelli
 Regan Bailey
 Laurence C. Baker
 Gilda Barabino
 Deanna Barch
 Dan Barouch
 Randall John Bateman
 Michelle L. Bell
 William Beltran
 Frederick DuBois Bowman
 Myles A. Brown
 Brendan G. Carr
 Nancy Carrasco
 Edward F. Chang
 Judy Cho
 Augustine Choi
 Peter Choyke
 Wendy Chung
 D. Wade Clapp
 Daniel Colón-Ramos
 Yolonda Lorig Colson
 Joanne Conroy
 Merit Cudkowicz
 Ralph DeBerardinis
 Ronald DeMatteo
 Justin B. Dimick
 Cynthia E. Dunbar
 B. Mark Evers
 Heinz Feldmann
 Toren Finkel
 David E. Fisher
 Scott E. Fraser
 Christopher Friese
 Sherine Gabriel
 Levi Garraway
 Jeffrey Louis Goldberg
 Steven N. Goodman
 Eric Gouaux
 Garth Graham
 William Grobman
 John Halamka
 Patrick Heagerty
 Joel Hirschhorn
 Vivian Ho
 Holly Humphrey
 Denise Jamieson
 Joel Kaufman
 Aaron Kesselheim
 Alex Kolodkin
 Kam Leong
 Fei-Fei Li
 Judy Lieberman
 Marc Lipsitch
 David R. Liu
 Susan Margulies
 Kameron Leigh Matthews
 Justin McArthur
 Matthew D. McHugh
 Jerry R. Mendell
 Raina Merchant
 Redonda Miller
 Henry L. Paulson
Hongjun Song
 Patricia Stone

2021 

 Samuel Achilefu
 Alexandra K. Adams
 Michelle Albert
 Guillermo Ameer
 Jamy D. Ard
 John M. Balbus
 Carolina Barillas-Mury
 Shari Barkin
 Monica Bertagnolli
 Luciana Borio
 Erik Brodt
 Kendall Marvin Campbell
 Pablo A. Celnik
 David Clapham
 Mandy Cohen
 Daniel E. Dawes
 Ted M. Dawson
 Job Dekker
 Nancy-Ann DeParle
 Maximilian Diehn
 Kafui Dzirasa
 Katherine A. Fitzgerald
 Yuman Fong
 Howard Frumkin
 Andrés J. Garcia
 Darrell J. Gaskin
 Wondwossen Gebreyes
 Jessica Gill
 Paul Ginsburg
 Sherita Hill Golden
 Joseph Gone
 Joseph D. Grabenstein
 Linda G. Griffith
 Taekjip Ha
 William C. Hahn
 Helena Hansen
 Mary Hatten
 Mary Hawn
 Zhigang He
 Hugh Carroll Hemmings Jr.
 Rene Hen
 Helen Heslop
 Renee Hsia
 Lori L. Isom
 Kathrin Jansen
 Christine Kreuder Johnson
 Mariana Julieta Kaplan
 Elisa Konofagou
 Jay Lemery
 Joan L. Luby
 Kenneth David Mandl
 Jennifer Manly
 Elizabeth M. McNally
 Nancy Messonnier
 Michelle Monje
 Vamsi Mootha
 Lennart Mucke
 Vivek Murthy
 Jane Wimpfheimer Newburger
 Keith C. Norris
 Marcella Nunez-Smith
 Osagie Obasogie
 Jacqueline Nwando Olayiwola
 Bruce Ovbiagele
 Drew Pardoll
 Guillermo Prado
 Carla Pugh
 Charles M. Rice
 Marylyn D. Ritchie
 Yvette Roubideaux
 Eric Rubin
 Renee Salas
 Thomas Sequist
 Kosali Simon
 Melissa Simon
 Anil Kumar Sood
 Reisa Sperling
 Sarah Szanton
 Sarah Tishkoff
 Peter Tontonoz
 JoAnn Trejo
 Gilbert Rivers Upchurch Jr.
 Tener Goodwin Veenema
 Leslie B. Vosshall
 Rochelle Walensky
 Elizabeth Winzeler
 Cynthia Wolberger
 Anita Zaidi
 Shannon Nicole Zenk
 Feng Zhang

References 

National Academy of Medicine